= Organization for Social Development =

Non-governmental organization

Organization for Social Development (OSD), formerly known as the Organization for Social Justice in Ethiopia (OSJE), is a non-governmental organization. OSD formally adopted its current name in November 2019 after re-registering as an Ethiopian Resident Charity with the Ministry of Justice's Charities and Societies Agency subsequent to the Charities and Societies Proclamation's enactment on February 13, 2009.

Since its founding in 2003, the Organization for Social Development has been actively involved. With Child Rights in Business Principle (CRBP) as its primary operational theme, the organization's varied actions range from improving human welfare, democracy, and good governance to optimizing the business sector's role in furthering social justice.
